List of Orthodox Archbishops of Shemokmedi of the Georgian Orthodox and Apostolic Church, centered on the Shemokmedi Monastery in Guria:
 Ioseb (present)

Georgian Orthodox Church
Shemokmedi